Shawville is a town located in the Pontiac Regional County Municipality in the administrative region of Outaouais in western Quebec, Canada.

History
At the end of the 1860s, a group of citizens from Clarendon Centre, under the leadership of James Shaw (1818-1877), separated the municipality from the township of Clarendon. While they had originally planned on naming the new entity "Daggville," after the name of a pioneer family, they opted instead to name it "Shawville" after James Shaw promised to donate 0.8 ha of land to the new municipality. Shawville was officially established in 1874 and was populated by Irish Protestant immigrants. Shaw, who had settled in the area in 1843, was the first mayor, serving from 1856 to 1877.

The municipality has a Methodist church that was built in Shawville in 1835, while the Catholic Parish of Saint-Alexandre-de-Clarendon opened its doors in 1840. This church would later be renamed as Sainte-Mélanie, and still later as Saint-Jacques-le-Majeur in 1917.

In recent times, Shawville has been the site of several conflicts between local shopkeepers and the Office québécois de la langue française over the province's language laws.

Geography
The town is completely enclosed within the municipality of Clarendon.

Demographics

Population

Language
Shawville is an overwhelmingly anglophone (with 85 percent of its residents listing English as their first language in the Canada 2006 Census) and Protestant (75%) community. This is unusual in Quebec, a province that is overwhelmingly French-speaking and Roman Catholic.

Culture

The town is characterized by its red-brick buildings, and unlike nearly every other municipality in Quebec, it has no Catholic church. Shawville is home to an elementary school, a high school, a regional hospital, and the SRPC national head office. Its businesses are mostly small and family-run.

The Shawville Fair, held the first weekend in September, is the town's major event. It has run every year since 1856 and includes typical county fair features such as livestock shows, auctions, truck pulls, demolition derbies, art/craft/hobby shows, diverse food stands and a midway. In recent years, it has drawn headline entertainers such as Terri Clark, Stompin' Tom Connors, Paul Brandt, April Wine, Dean Brody and Corb Lund, with total attendance reaching around 50,000. It will not run for the first time in its history in 2020, amid fears of COVID-19.

Sports
Shawville is represented in the Eastern Ontario Junior B Hockey League by the Shawville Pontiacs.

Local government

List of former mayors:
 Albert Armstrong (...–2013)
 Sandra A. Murray (2013–2021)
 Bill McCleary (2021–present)

Notable people
Famous people from Shawville include the former general manager of the Ottawa Senators, Bryan Murray, Terry Murray (current assistant coach of the Buffalo Sabres and former coach of the L.A. Kings), Tim Murray (former general manager of the Buffalo Sabres), NHL legend Frank "The Shawville Express" Finnigan and race horse owner and lawyer Clay Horner. Former NHL referee Blaine Angus also comes from the area.
Ray Harris, a prominent singer-songwriter in the Ottawa area, was raised in Shawville and later wrote the song Shawville Girl. Robert Taylor Telford who founded the Alberta city Leduc in 1891 was born in Shawville in 1860.

See also
 List of municipalities in Quebec
 Pontiac Pacific Junction Railway

References

External links

Official town site

Incorporated places in Outaouais
Municipalities in Quebec